Beep, beep may refer to:

 Beep Beep (band), a rock band from Omaha, Nebraska
 Beep, Beep (film), a Warner Bros. cartoon starring Wile E. Coyote and the Road Runner released in 1952
 Beep, beep (sound), onomatopoeia representing a noise, generally of a pair of identical tones following one after the other

Music
 "Beep Beep", the B-side of the 2012 Girls' Generation single "Flower Power"
 "Beep Beep", a Little Mix song from the album Glory Days
 Beep Beep (EP), the fourth EP by South Korean boy band BTOB
 "Beep Beep" (song), a novelty song by The Playmates
 "Beep! Beep!", a single by Louis Prima about his girlfriend communicating from space
 "Beep! Beep!", a single by the Atlanta, Georgia-based pop-band 13 Stories
 "Beep Beep" , the Korean debut single of Japanese singer Ruann

See also
 Beep (disambiguation)